Lee Strasberg (born Israel Strassberg; November 17, 1901 – February 17, 1982) was an American theatre director, actor and acting teacher. He co-founded, with theatre directors Harold Clurman and Cheryl Crawford, the Group Theatre in 1931, which was hailed as "America's first true theatrical collective". In 1951, he became director of the nonprofit Actors Studio in New York City, considered "the nation's most prestigious acting school," and, in 1966, was involved in the creation of Actors Studio West in Los Angeles.

Although other highly regarded teachers also developed versions of "The Method," Lee Strasberg is considered to be the "father of method acting in America," according to author Mel Gussow. From the 1920s until his death in 1982, "he revolutionized the art of acting by having a profound influence on performance in American theater and film." From his base in New York, Strasberg trained several generations of theatre and film notables, including Anne Bancroft, Dustin Hoffman, Montgomery Clift, James Dean, Marilyn Monroe, Jane Fonda, Julie Harris, Paul Newman, Ellen Burstyn, Al Pacino, Robert De Niro, Geraldine Page and Eli Wallach, and directors Andreas Voutsinas, Frank Perry and Elia Kazan.

By 1970, Strasberg had become less involved with the Actors Studio and, with his third wife, Anna, opened the Lee Strasberg Theatre & Film Institute with branches in New York City and in Hollywood, to continue teaching the 'system' of Konstantin Stanislavski, which he had interpreted and developed, particularly in light of the ideas of Yevgeny Vakhtangov, for contemporary actors. 

As an actor, Strasberg is best known for his portrayal of the primary antagonist, the gangster Hyman Roth, alongside his former student Al Pacino in The Godfather Part II (1974), a role he took at Pacino's suggestion after Kazan turned down the role, and which earned him a nomination for the Academy Award for Best Supporting Actor. He also appeared in Going in Style (1979) and ... And Justice for All (1979).

Early years 
Lee Strasberg was born Israel Strassberg in Budzanów in Austrian Poland (part of Austria-Hungary, now in Ukraine), to Jewish parents, Baruch Meyer Strassberg and his wife, Ida (born Chaia), née Diner, and was the youngest of three sons. His father emigrated to New York while his family remained in their home village with an uncle, a rabbinical teacher. His father, who worked as a presser in the garment industry, sent first for his eldest son and his daughter. Finally, enough money was saved to bring over his wife and his two remaining sons. In 1909 the family was reunited on Manhattan's Lower East Side, where they lived until the early 1920s. Young Strasberg took refuge in voracious reading and the companionship of his older brother, Zalmon, whose death in the 1918 influenza pandemic was so traumatic for the young Strasberg that, despite being a straight-A student, he dropped out of high school.

A relative introduced him to the theatre by giving him a small part in a Yiddish-language production being performed by the Progressive Drama Club. He later joined the Chrystie Street Settlement House's drama club. Philip Loeb, casting director of the Theater Guild, sensed that Strasberg could act, although he was not yet thinking of a full-time acting career and was still working as a shipping clerk and bookkeeper for a wig company. When he was 23 years old, he enrolled in the Clare Tree Major School of the Theater. He became a naturalized United States citizen on January 16, 1939, in New York City at the New York Southern District Court.

Encounter with Stanislavski 
Kazan biographer Richard Schickel described Strasberg's first experiences with the art of acting:

Strasberg eventually left the Clare Tree Major School to study with students of Stanislavski — Maria Ouspenskaya and Richard Boleslawski — at the American Laboratory Theatre. In 1925, Strasberg had his first professional appearance in Processional, a play produced by the Theater Guild.

According to Schickel:

Acting director and teacher

Group Theater 
He gained a reputation with the Theater Guild of New York and helped form the Group Theater in New York in 1931. There, he created a technique that became known as "The Method" or "Method Acting". His teaching style owed much to the Russian practitioner, Konstantin Stanislavski, whose book, An Actor Prepares (published in English in 1936), dealt with the psychology of acting. He began by directing, but his time was gradually taken up by the training of actors. Called "America's first true theatrical collective," the Group Theater immediately offered a few tuition-free scholarships for its three-year program to "promising students."

Publishers Weekly wrote, "The Group Theatre ... with its self-defined mission to reconnect theater to the world of ideas and actions, staged plays that confronted social and moral issues ... with members Harold Clurman, Lee Strasberg, Stella, and Luther Adler, Clifford Odets, Elia Kazan, and an ill-assorted band of idealistic actors living hand to mouth are seen welded in a collective of creativity that was also a tangle of jealousies, love affairs, and explosive feuds." Playwright Arthur Miller said, "the Group Theatre was unique and probably will never be repeated. For a while it was literally the voice of Depression America." Co-founder Harold Clurman, in describing what Strasberg brought to the Group Theater, wrote:

Strasberg, Kazan, Clurman, and others with the Group Theater spent the summer of 1936 at Pine Brook Country Club, located in the countryside of Nichols, Connecticut. They spent previous summers at various places in upstate New York and near Danbury, Connecticut.

Amid internecine tensions, Strasberg resigned as director of the Group Theatre in March 1937.

Actors Studio 
In 1947, Elia Kazan, Robert Lewis, and Cheryl Crawford, also members of the Group Theatre, started the Actors Studio as a nonprofit workshop for professional and aspiring actors to concentrate on their craft away from the pressures of the commercial theatre. Strasberg assumed leadership of the studio in 1951 as its artistic director. "As a teacher and acting theorist, he revolutionized American actor training and engaged such remarkable performers as Kim Hunter, Marilyn Monroe, Julie Harris, Paul Newman, Geraldine Page, Ellen Burstyn, and Al Pacino." Since its inception, the Studio has been a nonprofit educational corporation chartered by the state of New York, and has been supported entirely by contributions and benefits. "We have here the possibility of creating a kind of theatre that would be a shining medal for our country," Strasberg said in 1959. UCLA acting teacher Robert Hethmon writes, "The Actors Studio is a refuge. Its privacy is guarded ferociously against the casual intruder, the seeker of curiousities, and the exploiter... The Studio helps actors to meet the enemy within... and contributes greatly to Strasberg's utterly pragmatic views on training the actor and solving his problems... [The Studio] is kept deliberately modest in its circumstances, its essence being the private room where Lee Strasberg and some talented actors can work."

Strasberg wrote, "At the studio, we do not sit around and feed each other's egos. People are shocked how severe we are on each other." Admission to the Actors Studio was usually by audition with more than a thousand actors auditioning each year and the directors usually conferring membership on only five or six. "The Studio was, and is sui generis," said Elia Kazan, proudly. Beginning in a small, private way, with a strictly off-limits-to-outsiders policy, the Studio quickly earned a high reputation in theatre circles. "It became the place to be, the forum where all the most promising and unconventional young actors were being cultivated by sharp young directors." Actors who have worked at the studio include Julie Harris, Paul Newman, Joanne Woodward, Geraldine Page, Maureen Stapleton, Anne Bancroft, Dustin Hoffman, Patricia Neal, Rod Steiger, Mildred Dunnock, Eva Marie Saint, Eli Wallach, Anne Jackson, Ben Gazzara, Sidney Poitier, Karl Malden, Gene Wilder, Shelley Winters, Dennis Hopper, and Sally Field.

The Emmy Award-winning author of Inside Inside, James Lipton, writes that the Actors Studio became "one of the most prestigious institutions in the world" as a result of its desire to set a higher "standard" in acting. The founders, including Strasberg, demanded total commitment and extreme talent from aspiring students. Jack Nicholson auditioned five times before he was accepted; Dustin Hoffman, six times; and Harvey Keitel, 11 times. After each rejection, a candidate had to wait as long as a year to try again. Martin Landau and Steve McQueen were the only two students admitted one year, out of 2000 candidates who auditioned.
 Al Pacino: "The Actors Studio meant so much to me in my life. Lee Strasberg hasn't been given the credit he deserves. Brando doesn't give Lee any credit... Next to Charlie Laughton (an acting teacher at HB Studio, and not to be confused with English actor Charles Laughton), it sort of launched me. It really did. That was a remarkable turning point in my life. It was directly responsible for getting me to quit all those jobs and just stay acting."
 Marlon Brando: Movie stars spawned by Strasberg's Actors Studio were of a new type that is often labeled the "rebel hero," wrote Pamela Wojcik. Historian Sam Staggs writes that "Marlon Brando was the hot, sleek engine on the Actors Studio express," and called him "[the] embodiment of method acting," but Brando was trained primarily by Stella Adler, a former member of the Group Theatre, who had a falling out with Strasberg over his interpretations of Stanislavsky's ideas." He based his acting technique on the method, once stating, "It made me a real actor. The idea is you learn to use everything that happened in your life and you learn to use it in creating the character you're working on. You learn how to dig into your unconscious and make use of every experience you've ever had."

In Brando's autobiography, Songs My Mother Taught Me, the actor claimed he learned nothing from Strasberg: "After I had some success, Lee Strasberg tried to take credit for teaching me how to act. He never taught me anything. He would have claimed credit for the sun and the moon if he believed he could get away with it. He tried to project himself as an acting oracle and guru. Some people worshiped him, and I never knew why. I sometimes went to the Actors Studio on Saturday mornings because Elia Kazan was teaching, and there were usually a lot of good-looking girls there, but Strasberg never taught me acting. Stella did—and later Kazan."
 James Dean: According to James Dean biographer W. Bast, "Proud of this accomplishment, Dean referred to the studio in a 1952 letter, when he was 21 years old, to his family as 'The greatest school of the theater. It houses great people like Marlon Brando, Julie Harris, Arthur Kennedy, Mildred Dunnock. ... Very few get into it. ... It's the best thing that can happen to an actor. I'm one of the youngest to belong.'"
 Marilyn Monroe: Film author Maurice Zolotow wrote: "Between The Seven Year Itch and Some Like It Hot only four years elapsed, but her world had changed. She had become one of the most celebrated personalities in the world. She had divorced Joe DiMaggio. She had married Arthur Miller. She had become a disciple of Lee Strasberg. She was seriously studying acting. She was reading good books."
 Tennessee Williams: Tennessee Williams' plays have been populated by graduates of the studio, where he felt, "studio actors had a more intense and honest style of acting." He wrote, "They act from the inside out. They communicate emotions they really feel. They give you a sense of life." Williams was a co-founder of the group and a key member of its playwright's wing; he later wrote A Streetcar Named Desire, Brando's greatest early role.
 Jane Fonda: Jane Fonda recalled that at the age of 5, her brother, actor Peter Fonda, and she acted out Western stories similar to those her father, Henry Fonda, played in the movies. She attended Vassar College and went to Paris for two years to study art. Upon returning, she met Lee Strasberg and the meeting changed the course of her life, Fonda saying, "I went to the Actors Studio and Lee Strasberg told me I had talent. Real talent. It was the first time that anyone, except my father—who had to say so—told me I was good. At anything. It was a turning point in my life. I went to bed thinking about acting. I woke up thinking about acting. It was like the roof had come off my life!"

Teaching methods and philosophy 
In describing his teaching philosophy, Strasberg wrote, "The two areas of discovery that were of primary importance in my work at the Actors Studio and in my private classes were improvisation and affective memory. It is finally by using these techniques that the actor can express the appropriate emotions demanded of the character." Strasberg demanded great discipline of his actors, as well as great depths of psychological truthfulness. He once explained his approach in this way:

According to film critic and author Mel Gussow, Strasberg required that an actor, when preparing for a role, delve not only into the character's life in the play but also, "Far more importantly, into the character's life before the curtain rises. In rehearsal, the character's prehistory, perhaps going back to childhood, is discussed and even acted out. The play became the climax of the character's existence."

Elia Kazan as student 
In Elia Kazan's autobiography, the Academy Award–winning director wrote about his earliest memories of Strasberg as teacher:

Classroom settings 
Kazan described the classes taught by Strasberg:

James Dean 

In 1955 Strasberg student James Dean died in a car accident, at age 24. Strasberg, during a regular lecture shortly after this accident, discussed Dean. The following are excerpts from a transcription of his recorded lecture:

On Marilyn Monroe 
In 1962, Marilyn Monroe died at age 36. At the time of her death, she was at the height of her career. In 1999, she was ranked the sixth-greatest female star of classic Hollywood cinema by the American Film Institute. Lee Strasberg gave the eulogy at her funeral.

Personal life 
Lee Strasberg's first marriage was to Nora Krecaum from October 29, 1926, until her death three years later in 1929. In 1934, he married actress and drama coach Paula Miller (1909–1966) until her death from cancer in 1966. Lee and Paula were the parents of actress Susan Strasberg (1938–1999) and acting teacher John Strasberg (born 1941). His third wife was the former Anna Mizrahi (born April 16, 1939) and the mother of his two youngest children, Adam Lee Strasberg (born July 29, 1969) and David Lee Israel Strasberg (born January 30, 1971).

Death and commemoration 

Lee Strasberg suffered a fatal heart attack and died on February 17, 1982, in New York City, aged 80. With him at the time of his death at the hospital were his third wife, Anna, and their two sons. He was interred at Westchester Hills Cemetery in Hastings-on-Hudson, New York. A day before his unexpected death, he was officially notified that he had been elected to the American Theater Hall of Fame. His last public appearance was on February 14, 1982, at Night of 100 Stars in the Radio City Music Hall, a benefit for the Actors Fund of America. Along with Al Pacino and Robert De Niro, he danced in the chorus line with The Rockettes.

Actress Ellen Burstyn recalled that evening:

In an 80th birthday interview, he said that he was looking forward to his next 20 years in the theater. According to friends, he was healthy until the day he died. "It was so unexpected," Al Pacino said. "What stood out was how youthful he was. He never seemed as old as his years. He was an inspiration." Actress Jane Fonda said after hearing of his death, "I'm not sure I even would have become an actress were it not for him. He will be missed, but he leaves behind a great legacy."

Legacy 
"Whether directly influenced by Strasberg or not," wrote acting author Pamela Wojcik, "the new male stars all to some degree or other adapted method techniques to support their identification as rebels.... He recreates romance as a drama of male neuroticism and also invests his characterization 'with an unprecedented aura of verisimilitude.'" Acting teacher and author Alison Hodge explains, "Seemingly spontaneous, intuitive, brooding, 'private,' lit with potent vibrations from an inner life of conflict and contradiction, their work exemplified the style of heightened naturalism which (whether Brando agrees or not) Lee Strasberg devoted his life to exploring and promoting." Pamela Wojcik adds:

In 2012, Strasberg's family donated his library of personal papers to the Library of Congress. The papers include 240 boxes containing correspondence, rehearsal notes, photographs, theatrical drawings and posters, sketches of stage designs, and more.

Lee Strasberg, his wife Paula, his daughter Susan, and his son John, all appear as characters in Robert Brustein's 1998 play Nobody Dies on Friday, which one critic called a "scathing portrait of Strasberg," but one that "can by no means be dismissed as a simple act of character assassination." Brustein, a critic, director, and producer, had previously made public his dislike of the method as a philosophy of acting. The play was produced by Brustein's American Repertory Theater in Cambridge, Massachusetts, and was later presented in Singapore.

Strasberg is a character in Names, Mark Kemble's play about former Group Theatre members' struggles during the blacklist era.

In 2020, Google Arts & Culture, together with Giovanni Morassutti, an Italian actor who has deepened the study of The Method and long-time collaborator of John Strasberg, have created an online exhibition named Strasberg Legacy tracing the history of the realistic school of acting.

Broadway credits 
Note: All works are plays and the original productions, unless otherwise noted.
 Four Walls (1927) – actor
 The Vegetable (1929) – director
 Red Rust (1929) – actor
 Green Grow the Lilacs (1931) – actor
 The House of Connelly (1931) – codirector
 1931 (1931) – director
 Success Story (1932) – director
 Men in White (1933) – director
 Gentlewoman (1934) – director
 Gold Eagle Guy (1934) – director
 Paradise Lost (1935) – produced by Group Theatre
 Case of Clyde Griffiths (1936) – director, produced by Group Theatre
 Johnny Johnson (1936) – director, produced by Group Theatre
 Many Mansions (1937) – director
 Golden Boy (1937) – produced by Group Theatre
 Roosty (1938) – director
 Casey Jones (1938), produced by Group Theatre
 All the Living (1938) – director
 Dance Night (1938) – director
 Rocket exhibitionn (1938) – produced by Group Theatre
 The Gentle People (1939) – produced by Group Theatre
 Awake and Sing! (1939), revival – produced by Group Theatre
 Summer Night (1939) – director
 Night Music (1940) – produced by Group Theatre
 The Fifth Column (1940) – director
 Clash by Night (1941) – director
 A Kiss for Cinderella (1942), revival – director
 R.U.R. (Rossum's Universal Robots) (1942), revival – director
 Apology (1943) – producer and director
 South Pacific (1943, apparently no relation to the Broadway musical South Pacific) – director
 Skipper Next to God (1948) – director
 The Big Knife (1949) – director
 The Closing Door (1949) – director
 The Country Girl (1950) – co-producer
 Peer Gynt (1951), revival – director
 Strange Interlude (1963), revival – produced by The Actors Studio – Tony Award co-nomination for Best Producer of a Play
 Marathon '33 (1963) – production supervisor
 Three Sisters (1964), revival – director, produced by the Actors Studio

Film credits 
 Parnell (1937) as Pat (uncredited)
 China Venture (1953) as Patterson
 The Godfather Part II (1974; nominated, Academy Award Best Actor in a Supporting Role) as Hyman Roth
 The Cassandra Crossing (1977) as Herman Kaplan
 The Last Tenant (1978, TV movie).
 ...And Justice for All. (1979) as Sam Kirkland
 Boardwalk (1979) as David Rosen
 Going in Style (1979) as Willie
 Skokie (1981, TV movie) as Morton Weisman

See also 
 Ion Cojar
 Stanislavski's system
 Method acting
 Constantin Stanislavski
 Ivana Chubbuck
 Marilyn Monroe
 Michael Chekhov
 Notable alumni of the Lee Strasberg Theatre and Film Institute
 Sanford Meisner
 Stella Adler

References

External links 

 The Lee Strasberg Theatre & Film Institute
 Strasberg video lectures
 
 
 
 John Strasberg Studios
 Audio Interview with Lee Strasberg on WGBH

1901 births
1982 deaths
Austro-Hungarian Jews
American people of Polish-Jewish descent
People from Ternopil Oblast
People from the Kingdom of Galicia and Lodomeria
Naturalized citizens of the United States
Jews from Galicia (Eastern Europe)
Austro-Hungarian emigrants to the United States
Acting theorists
American male film actors
Method actors
American male stage actors
Drama teachers
Jewish theatre directors
Jewish American male actors
20th-century American male actors
Burials at Westchester Hills Cemetery
20th-century American Jews